These are the Official Charts Company's UK Dance Chart number-one albums of 2012. The dates listed in the menus below represent the Saturday after the Sunday the chart was announced, as per the way the dates are given in chart publications such as the ones produced by Billboard, Guinness, and Virgin.

Chart history

See also

List of UK Albums Chart number ones of the 2010s
List of UK Dance Singles Chart number ones of 2012
List of UK Album Downloads Chart number ones of the 2010s
List of UK Independent Singles Chart number ones of 2012
List of UK Independent Singles Chart number ones of 2012
List of UK R&B Albums Chart number ones of 2012

References

External links
Dance Albums Chart at the Official Charts Company
UK Top 40 Dance Album Chart at BBC Radio 1

2012
2012 in British music
United Kingdom Dance Albums